Francis David Ormsby-Gore, 6th Baron Harlech (13 March 1954 – 1 February 2016), was a peer in the United Kingdom.

Early life
Lord Harlech was born in 1954, the fifth child and second son of David Ormsby-Gore, 5th Baron Harlech, and his wife Sylvia Lloyd Thomas. He was educated at Worth School, a private Catholic school in West Sussex. His mother died in a car crash in 1967. His elder brother Julian committed suicide in 1974, making Ormsby-Gore the heir to the Harlech barony.

The sixth baron Harlech eventually succeeded his father in 1985, this is after his father, the fifth baron also died in a car crash. He sat as a Conservative member of the House of Lords until the removal of the hereditary peers in 1999.

Harlech lived at Brogyntyn near Oswestry and later at The Mount, Racecourse Road, Oswestry. He also owned Glyn Cywarch in Talsarnau.

Personal life
In 1986, Harlech married Amanda Jane Grieve, who studied English at Oxford. She was a daughter of solicitor Alan Grieve, a director of the Jerwood Foundation, and his first wife, Anne Dulake. Before Lord and Lady Harlech were divorced on 31 August 1998, they had a son and a daughter:
 Jasset David Cody Ormsby-Gore, 7th Baron Harlech (born 1 July 1986), who studied at Central St Martins, and who was elected to take Lord Elton's seat in the House of Lords in 2021.
 Tallulah Sylvia Maria Ormsby-Gore (born 16 May 1988).

In 2011, it was revealed that he had been sectioned under the Mental Health Act.

He died of natural causes on 1February 2016. A North Wales Police spokesman said, "North Wales Police were called to an address at Talsarnau near Harlech at 11.40am on Monday, following reports of the sudden death of a man in his 60s."

Titles 
 13 March 1954 – 14 February 1964: Master Francis David Ormsby-Gore
 14 February 1964 – 26 January 1985: The Honourable Francis David Ormsby-Gore
 26 January 1985 – 1 February 2016: The Right Honourable The Lord Harlech

References

External links
Francis Ormsby-Gore, 6th Baron Harlech

1954 births
2016 deaths
British people of Irish descent
British people of Scottish descent
Conservative Party (UK) hereditary peers
People educated at Worth School
Francis
6
Younger sons of barons
Welsh landowners
Harlech